Mahtob Maryam Mahmoody (Persian: مهتاب محمودى born September 4, 1979) is an American author who wrote the autobiographical memoir My Name is Mahtob, which depicts her perspective of her family's story when she and her mother, Betty Mahmoody, were held captive by her father, Sayyed Bozorg Mahmoody, in his country of birth, Iran, for a period of 18 months during the mid 1980s.  Her mother wrote her version of their story in her 1987 biography Not Without My Daughter, which was adapted into a 1991 feature film of the same name in which Mahtob was portrayed by Sheila Rosenthal and her parents were portrayed by Sally Field and Alfred Molina.

Biography

Mahtob was born to parents Betty and Sayyed Bozorg "Moody" Mahmoody in Houston on September 4, 1979.  Her first name means "Moonlight" in Persian. It was her father who named her that after he was inspired by a full moon.  Mahtob has two half-brothers through Betty's first marriage, Joe and John, who are 13 and nine years older than her respectively. Mahtob and her parents lived in Texas before moving to Michigan. She grew up in Alpena, Michigan.

On August 4, 1984, Mahtob and her parents arrived in Tehran to meet with Moody's relatives. Their stay was originally meant to have lasted only two weeks, but Mahtob and Betty were held captive by Moody for eighteen months. According to Mahtob, Betty suspected that Moody would keep them in Iran when he suggested that they visit, but she was afraid that if she said no, he would abduct Mahtob.  Mahtob stated in an interview with NPR:

Since Sayyed was Iranian by birth, he legally had complete custody of Mahtob. Betty was worried that Mahtob would learn anti-American sentiment at school. Mahtob also alleged that her father would beat her and her mother. After eighteen months, Mahtob and her mother managed to escape Iran by crossing the mountains of Turkey.  They successfully made it back to the United States and Mahtob never saw her father again. Six years after Moody's death in 2009, Mahtob has confirmed that she has forgiven her father for his actions.

When Mahtob was 13, she was diagnosed with lupus. She managed to survive the disease because of experimental treatment. She resides in Grand Rapids, Michigan. Mahtob is a devout member of the Wisconsin Evangelical Lutheran Synod.

In 2015, Mahtob's memoir My Name is Mahtob was published. Though it depicts Mahtob's version of her family's story, My Name is Mahtob has been considered a sequel to her mother's book, Not Without My Daughter.

References

External links
Facebook page

Living people
1979 births
People from Houston
People from Alpena, Michigan
American activists
American memoirists
Writers from Houston
Writers from Michigan
American people of Iranian descent
People from Grand Rapids, Michigan
Writers from Grand Rapids, Michigan
American Lutherans
Christians from Michigan
Christians from Texas
American women memoirists
21st-century American women